Hannah Margalit Fidell (born October 7, 1985) is an American film director, producer and screenwriter. Her directorial debut was the drama film A Teacher (2013). She also wrote and directed the romantic drama film 6 Years (2015) and the comedy film The Long Dumb Road (2018).

Early life
Fidell was born in Washington, D.C. and raised in Bethesda, Maryland. Her mother is Pulitzer Prize-winning journalist Linda Greenhouse and her father is lawyer Eugene R. Fidell. She studied film theory at Indiana University Bloomington, from which she graduated in 2007. After graduating, Fidell worked at Ridley Scott commercial production company in New York City, before leaving to study media at The New School. At the time of making A Teacher, she was working part-time at a restaurant to subsidize her filmmaking. In 2012, Filmmaker named Fidell one of the 25 New Faces of Independent Film. She is Jewish, as is her mother.

Career
In 2010, Fidell wrote, directed, produced and acted in the film We're Glad You're Here. The following year, she wrote, directed and produced the short film The Gathering Squall (2011). She also produced the short film Man & Gun (2011).

Fidell wrote, directed, and produced the feature film A Teacher (2013), starring Lindsay Burdge and Will Brittain, which premiered at the 2013 Sundance Film Festival on January 20, 2013. The film follows an affair between a high school teacher and her student. It was released in the United States on September 6, 2013 by Oscilloscope Laboratories. In February 2014, it was announced that A Teacher would be adapted for television by HBO. Fidell will write and executive produce the series along with Danny Brocklehurst, the former showrunner of the UK television series Shameless.

In June 2014, it was announced that Fidell had written and directed the drama film 6 Years, starring Taissa Farmiga and Ben Rosenfield in the lead roles. The film follows a long-term young couple who are about to graduate college, when events threaten to tear them apart. The film had its world premiere at the South by Southwest Film Festival on March 14, 2015. Shortly after the film premiered, the global distribution rights were acquired by Netflix. The film was released on August 18, 2015 on iTunes, and globally through Netflix on September 8, 2015.

Fidell subsequently co-wrote and directed her third feature-length film, The Long Dumb Road, starring Tony Revolori and Jason Mantzoukas in leading roles. The film premiered at the Sundance Film Festival on January 26, 2018. Shortly after, Universal Pictures acquired distribution rights to the film, with a planned day-and-date limited release in November 2018.

In April 2018, it was announced that Fidell and Doug Belgrad were developing a true crime series at Paramount Television based on Rachel Aviv's 2017 The New Yorker article "Remembering the Murder You Didn't Commit", with Fidell set to write and direct. More recently, she signed a deal at FX.

Personal life
Fidell married artist Jake Longstreth on September 23, 2017 in Inverness, California. Her brother-in-law is Dirty Projectors lead singer and guitarist David Longstreth.

Filmography

Awards and nominations

References

External links
 

1985 births
Living people
Film producers from New York (state)
Screenwriters from New York (state)
American women film directors
American women screenwriters
Jewish American writers
Television producers from New York City
American women television producers
English-language film directors
Film directors from Maryland
Indiana University Bloomington alumni
People from Bethesda, Maryland
People from Washington, D.C.
The New School alumni
American women film producers
Film directors from Washington, D.C.
Screenwriters from Maryland
Screenwriters from Washington, D.C.
21st-century American women writers
21st-century American screenwriters